Hillstomp is an American punk blues duo consisting of Henry Hill Kammerer and John "Lord Buckets" Johnson from Portland, Oregon, known for unique versions of traditional material and energetic live performances. They are also known for original material. Notable originals include "Northeast Portland 3AM", "Lucy's Lament" and "Graverobber's Blues". Hillstomp was featured in the third season of "Sons of Anarchy". Hillstomp has toured the US, and Europe since 2002.

In December 2005, their album The Woman that Ended the World was named Album of the Year by Portland alternative weekly Willamette Week.

Hillstomp credits R.L. Burnside as one of their biggest musical influences. They are considered to be forerunners in the modern two piece blues revival, along with the Black Keys, Doo Rag, and the White Stripes.

Discography
 2005: One Word
 2005: The Woman That Ended the World
 2007: After Two But Before Five
 2010: Darker the Night
 2014: Portland, Ore
2018: Monster Receiver

External links
Hillstomp's Website
Interview with Hillstomp

Punk blues musical groups
Rock music duos
Musical groups from Portland, Oregon